Noé Delpech (born 22 February 1986) is a French sailor in the 49er FX class. Together with Julien d'Ortoli he won a bronze medal at the 2013 European Championships and placed fifth at the 2016 Olympics.

Delpech was born in Montpellier and grew up in Réunion, where he took up sailing in 1993; in 2003 he moved to Antibes. Since 2007 he races with d'Ortoli. The pair has a nickname Juno from the combination of the first two letters of their given names.

References

External links 
 
 
 
 
 

1986 births
Living people
Olympic sailors of France
Sailors at the 2016 Summer Olympics – 49er FX
21st-century French people